The New Zealand cricket team toured South Africa from 19 to 31 August 2016 for a two-match Test series. Faf du Plessis was named as the stand-in captain for South Africa, after AB de Villiers suffered an elbow injury. 

The first Test at Durban was the earliest that a Test match had been played in the South African summer. There has never been any Tests in South Africa in September either. The previous earliest was the first Test of the 1902–03 series against Australia, which started in Johannesburg on 11 October 1902.

South Africa won the series 1–0, with a 204-run victory in the second Test after most of the play in the first Test was affected by rain. It was South Africa's fifth consecutive series win against New Zealand.

Squads

Test series

1st Test

2nd Test

References

External links
 Series home at ESPNCricinfo

2016 in New Zealand cricket
2016 in South African cricket
International cricket competitions in 2016
New Zealand cricket tours of South Africa